This is a list of singles that have peaked in the Top 10 of the Billboard Hot 100 during 2009.

Lady Gaga scored five top ten hits during the year with "Just Dance", "Poker Face", "LoveGame", "Paparazzi", and "Bad Romance", the most among all other artists, she is also the 10th female solo artist to garner four top ten hits from a debut album.

Top-ten singles
Key
 – indicates single's top 10 entry was also its Hot 100 debut
 – indicates Best performing song of the year
(#) – 2009 year-end top 10 single position and rank

2008 peaks

2010 peaks

See also
 2009 in music
 Hot 100 number-one hits of 2009 (United States)
 Billboard Year-End Hot 100 singles of 2009

References

General sources

Joel Whitburn Presents the Billboard Hot 100 Charts: The 2000s
Additional information obtained can be verified within Billboard's online archive services and print editions of the magazine.

External links
Billboard.com

2009
United States Hot 100 Top 10 Singles